Total World Domination is the fourth full-length studio album by the New York crossover thrash band, Sworn Enemy. The album was released in the United States on June 16, 2009.

Track listing
Sell My Soul - 3:24
Aftermath - 4:02
Run for Shelter - 3:37
Still Hating - 2:54
On the Outside - 3:08
Lies - 2:48
Ready to Fight - 3:19
Disconnect - 2:58
Step Into the Ring - 3:44
Home of the Brave - 3:09

Credits
Sal Lococo - vocals
Lorenzo Antonucci - guitar
Jamin Hunt - guitar
Sid Awesome - bass guitar
Jerad Buckwalter - drums
Dave Quiggle - artwork

Sworn Enemy albums
2009 albums
Century Media Records albums